Ausburg Auggies 

  

Marcus LeVesseur (born July 17, 1982) is a retired American mixed martial artist who competed in the Lightweight division. A professional competitor since 2003, he competed for the UFC and Adrenaline MMA.
As a collegiate wrestler, LeVesseur was the only four-time undefeated NCAA Division III National Champion 
in history, and one of the three to do so across all three NCAA divisions.
Only Cael Sanderson of Division I - Iowa State University (159-0), Joey Davis of Division II - Notre Dame College (133-0), and Marcus LeVesseur of Division III - Augsburg University (155-0) have completed their collegiate careers as undefeated, four-time NCAA champions.

Background
Born and raised in Minneapolis, LeVesseur began wrestling at the age of five and went on to become a four-time State Champion at Roosevelt High School, and spent his senior year at Bloomington Kennedy High School. LeVesseur, who was also a talented football player as a quarterback and competed in track and field, had a 141-match win streak heading into college, and holds the high school wrestling state record for most wins, including one over future Olympian and Bellator Welterweight Champion, Ben Askren. LeVesseur, who also excelled academically, was offered a scholarship to compete at the University of Minnesota, but transferred to NCAA Division III Augsburg College before beginning his freshman season for Minnesota. As a college wrestler, LeVesseur was undefeated and untied, with a record of 155–0. He won four NCAA Division III Championships individually, and was a member of two teams that won National Championships. Since his last loss in high school competition LeVesseur compiled an amateur wrestling record of 296–0 through his senior year at Augsburg. He is only the second college wrestler ever to finish his career unbeaten and untied, with a 155–0 career record (Cael Sanderson was the first with a 159–0 record; Joey Davis has since joined them with a 133-0 record). LeVesseur ended his high school wrestling career 141-match unbeaten streak, which when combined with his unbeaten college career was 296–0. LeVesseur also continued with football at Augsburg, breaking multiple touchdown and rushing records for the conference and school as a quarterback.

Mixed martial arts career

Early career
LeVesseur made his MMA debut in 2003 against Doug Henkey. He won via KO 44 seconds into round one and went on to compiled a record of 21-5 while competing for regional promotions.

Ultimate Fighting Championship
In April 2012 it was reported that LeVesseur had signed a four-fight deal with the UFC.  He made his debut as a replacement for Aaron Riley against Cody McKenzie on May 15, 2012 at UFC on Fuel TV: Korean Zombie vs. Poirier. He lost the fight via submission in the first round.

LeVesseur defeated Carlo Prater on October 5, 2012 at UFC on FX 5 via split decision.

LeVesseur was expected to face Michael Chiesa on December 8, 2012 at UFC on Fox 5, replacing an injured Rafaello Oliveira.  However, the week of the event, Chiesa was forced out of the bout with LeVesseur with an undisclosed illness and the bout was scrapped altogether. Then on the day of the weigh-ins for the event, Tim Means was forced from his bout with Abel Trujillo after sustaining a head injury caused by a fall in a hotel sauna and LeVesseur stepped up to face Trujillo. He lost the fight via TKO in the second round and was subsequently released from the promotion.

Mixed martial arts record

|-
|Loss
|align=center|22–7
|Abel Trujillo
|TKO (knees to the body)
|UFC on Fox: Henderson vs. Diaz
|
|align=center|2
|align=center|3:56
|Seattle, Washington, United States
|
|-
|Win
|align=center|22–6
|Carlo Prater
|Decision (split)
|UFC on FX: Browne vs. Bigfoot
|
|align=center|3
|align=center|5:00
|Minneapolis, Minnesota, United States
|
|-
|Loss
|align=center|21–6
|Cody McKenzie
|Submission (guillotine choke)
|UFC on Fuel TV: Korean Zombie vs. Poirier
|
|align=center|1
|align=center|3:05
|Fairfax, Virginia, United States
|
|-
|Win
|align=center|21–5
|Taurean Bogguess
|Decision (unanimous)
|MSC: High Stakes 
|
|align=center|3
|align=center|5:00
|Hinckley, Minnesota, United States
|
|-
|Win
|align=center|20–5
|Brian Geraghty
|TKO (punches) 
|Seconds Out/Vivid MMA: Combat on Capitol Hill 5
|
|align=center|1
|align=center|1:52
|St. Paul, Minnesota, United States
|
|-
|Win
|align=center|19–5
|Dane Sayers
|Decision (unanimous)
|Showdown at the Sheraton
|
|align=center|3
|align=center|5:00
|St. Paul, Minnesota, United States
|
|-
|Loss
|align=center|18–5
|Dakota Cochrane
|Submission (triangle choke)
|Combat on Capitol Hill 4
|
|align=center|1
|align=center|4:08
|St. Paul, Minnesota, United States
|
|-
|Win
|align=center|18–4
|Josh Bumgarner
|Submission (rear-naked choke)
|Combat on Capitol Hill 3
|
|align=center|2
|align=center|4:21
|St. Paul, Minnesota, United States
|
|-
|Win
|align=center|17–4
|Morrison Lamb
|TKO (doctor stoppage)
|Combat on Capitol Hill 2
|
|align=center|1
|align=center|3:43
|St. Paul, Minnesota, United States
|
|-
|Win
|align=center|16–4
|Jay Ellis
|KO (punches)
|ECO: Extreme Cagefighting Organization 6
|
|align=center|1
|align=center|0:53
|Wisconsin Dells, Wisconsin, United States
|
|-
| Loss
|align=center|15–4
|Jason Buck
|TKO (punches)
|Havoc at the Hyatt II
|
|align=center|2
|align=center|4:20
|Minneapolis, Minnesota, United States
|
|-
|Win
|align=center|15–3
|Mike Plazola
|Submission (rear-naked choke)
|Havoc at the Hyatt
|
|align=center|1
|align=center|4:45
|Minneapolis, Minnesota, United States
|
|-
|Win
|align=center|14–3
|Bruce Johnson
|Submission (rear-naked choke)
|Seconds Out 11/20/09
|
|align=center|1
|align=center|2:04
|St. Paul, Minnesota, United States
|
|-
|Win
|align=center|13–3
|Eric Marriott
|Decision (unanimous)
|Seconds Out 2/13/09
|
|align=center|3
|align=center|5:00
|Maplewood, Minnesota, United States
|
|-
|Win
|align=center|12–3
|RT Hicks
|KO (punch)
|MCS: Minnesota Combat Sports
|
|align=center|1
|align=center|0:10
|St. Paul, Minnesota, United States
|
|-
|Loss
|align=center|11–3
|Brian Cobb
|Submission (rear-naked choke)
|War Gods: Do or Die
|
|align=center|2
|align=center|2:35
|Fresno, California, United States
|
|-
|Win
|align=center|11–2
|Ismael Gonzalez
|Submission (rear-naked choke)
|WG: War Gods
|
|align=center|2
|align=center|1:46
|Fresno, California, United States
|
|-
|Win
|align=center|10–2
|Henry King
|Submission (rear-naked choke)
|MF 4: Max Fights 4
|
|align=center|1
|align=center|1:06
|Fargo, North Dakota, United States
|
|-
|Loss
|align=center|9–2
|Tom Belt
|TKO (punches)
|Adrenaline MMA: Guida vs Russow
|
|align=center|1
|align=center|4:10
|Chicago, Illinois, United States
|
|-
|Win
|align=center|9–1
|Johnny Case
|KO (punch)
|SO: Seconds Out
|
|align=center|1
|align=center|0:23
|St. Paul, Minnesota, United States
|
|-
|Win
|align=center|8–1
|Jesse Evans
|Submission (rear-naked choke)
|MF 3: Max Fights 3
|
|align=center|1
|align=center|1:30
|Fargo, North Dakota, United States
|
|-
|Loss
|align=center|7–1
|Derek Abram
|TKO (knee injury)
|UCS: Battle on the Bay 9
|
|align=center|1
|align=center|0:15
|Superior, Wisconsin, United States
|
|-
|Win
|align=center|7–0
|Mike Sanchez
|TKO (punches)
|FCC 31: Freestyle Combat Challenge 31
|
|align=center|1
|align=center|1:23
|Kenosha, Wisconsin, United States
|
|-
|Win
|align=center|6–0
|Richard Silva
|Submission (rear-naked choke)
|WFC - Downtown Throwdown
|
|align=center|2
|align=center|1:42
|Minneapolis, Minnesota, United States
|
|-
|Win
|align=center|5–0
|Josh Marker
|TKO (doctor stoppage)
|EFX: Fury
|
|align=center|1
|align=center|0:38
|Minneapolis, Minnesota, United States
|
|-
|Win
|align=center|4–0
|Billy Walters
|KO (punches)
|EFX: Fury
|
|align=center|1
|align=center|0:51
|Minneapolis, Minnesota, United States
|
|-
|Win
|align=center|3–0
|Jaxson Mason
|Decision (unanimous)
|EFX: Fury
|
|align=center|3
|align=center|5:00
|Minneapolis, Minnesota, United States
|
|-
|Win
|align=center|2–0
|Yancy Cueller
|TKO (punches)
|EFX: EFX
|
|align=center|1
|align=center|0:27
|Minneapolis, Minnesota, United States
|
|-
|Win
|align=center|1–0
|Doug Henkey
|KO (punch)
|EC: Best of the Best 1
|
|align=center|1
|align=center|0:44
|Fridley, Minnesota, United States
|

See also
List of male mixed martial artists

References

 USA Today
 2004 Augsburg News Story
 win-magazine.com

External links
 
 
 Marcus LeVesseur at MixedMartialArts.com

1982 births
Living people
American male mixed martial artists
African-American mixed martial artists
Mixed martial artists from Minnesota
Lightweight mixed martial artists
Mixed martial artists utilizing collegiate wrestling
American male sport wrestlers
Augsburg Auggies football players
Augsburg Auggies wrestlers
Sportspeople from Minneapolis
People from Eagan, Minnesota
Roosevelt High School (Minnesota) alumni
Ultimate Fighting Championship male fighters
21st-century African-American sportspeople
20th-century African-American people